Timbertown is a popular attraction, depicting the colonial era of a sawmiller's village in northern New South Wales. It is located on 39 hectares (87 acres) of coastal blackbutt (Eucalyptus pilularis) forest on the Oxley Highway at Wauchope in Australia. Timbertown is an interactive museum which has enjoyed periodic success as a family-friendly tourist attraction. The Mayor of Timbertown is Marcel Rigmond. The Timbertown log, that used to be located in front of the museum, is now located directly across from an IGA.

Timbertown was officially opened by the Governor of New South Wales, Sir Arthur Roden Cutler on 28 May 1977.

Attractions 

The key attraction of Timbertown is the 595mm narrow gauge Timbertown Heritage Railway, with a John Fowler & Co. saddle tank 0-4-2t steam locomotive (“Ruby”) built in 1928, that operates on a short circuit track within and around the town.

There are also several businesses operating including a blacksmith, timber furniture, winery, and Wallaces Store with souvenirs and confectionery.

The Maul and Wedge serves meals in school holidays & public holidays and is available for hire for private functions.

Local artisans offer both local woodwork, artwork and craft items.

There are some interactive displays throughout the day featuring:
 Cross cut saw demonstrations 
 Horse and carriage rides
 Steam locomotive  rides
 Miniature railway rides
 Blacksmithing demonstrations
 Panning for gold
 Seasonal-limited time Thomas The Tank Engine

Former Attractions 
Bullocky team

Fun Facts 

 In 2008 Timbertown won the Mid North Coast Tourism Award for Business Excellence.

References

External links
Step back in time at Timbertown
Visit NSW Government Tourist website

2 ft gauge railways in Australia
Forestry museums
Forestry in Australia
Museums in New South Wales
Open-air museums in Australia
Railway museums in New South Wales
Wauchope, New South Wales